Epiblema glenni is a species of moth of the family Tortricidae. It is found in North America, where it has been recorded from Illinois, Kentucky, Michigan, Missouri, North Carolina, Ohio and Tennessee.

References

Moths described in 2002
Eucosmini